Orphe is a genus of skippers in the family Hesperiidae.

Species
The following species are recognised in the genus Orphe:
 Orphe gerasa (Hewitson, [1867]) 
 Orphe vatinius Godman, 1901

References

Natural History Museum Lepidoptera genus database

Hesperiinae
Hesperiidae genera